The 1926 International Cross Country Championships was held in Woluwe-Saint-Pierre, Brussels, Belgium, at the Hippodrome de Stockel on March 28, 1926.  A report on the event was given in the Glasgow Herald.

Complete results, medallists, 
 and the results of British athletes were published.

Medallists

Individual Race Results

Men's (9 mi / 14.5 km)

Team Results

Men's

Participation
An unofficial count yields the participation of 53 athletes from 6 countries.

 (9)
 (9)
 (9)
 (8)
 (9)
 (9)

See also
 1926 in athletics (track and field)

References

International Cross Country Championships
International Cross Country Championships
Cross
International Cross Country Championships
Sports competitions in Brussels
1920s in Brussels
Cross country running in Belgium
International Cross Country Championships